Ángel Maria Berroa Selmo (born January 27, 1977) is a Dominican professional baseball coach and former professional baseball infielder. He played in Major League Baseball (MLB) for the Kansas City Royals, Los Angeles Dodgers, New York Yankees and New York Mets. Berroa was selected as the 2003 American League Rookie of the Year.

Playing career

Early career
Berroa was originally signed as an undrafted free agent by the Oakland Athletics in 1997. He made his professional debut in the Arizona Fall League in 1999 and then played briefly with the A's Double-A team, the Midland RockHounds. In 2000, with the Visalia Oaks in the Single-A California League he received an honorable mention on the California League All-Star team when he recorded 11 doubles and stole 11 bases in 129 games.

Kansas City Royals
Berroa was acquired in 2001 by the Kansas City Royals from the Oakland Athletics in a three-way trade also involving the Tampa Bay Devil Rays. Kansas City acquired Berroa, relief pitcher Roberto Hernández, and backup catcher A. J. Hinch in exchange for  Johnny Damon and infielder Mark Ellis.  He spent the 2001 season with the Single-A Wilmington Blue Rocks and the Double-A Wichita Wranglers.

He made his major league debut on September 18, 2001, for the Royals against the Cleveland Indians  as a defensive replacement and went 0–1 in his debut. He recorded his first career Major League hit in his first career start, at shortstop on September 25 off of Detroit Tigers pitcher José Lima. He played in a total of 15 games that season and hit .302 in 53 at-bats.

In 2002, he spent most of the season with the Triple-A Omaha Royals. He was selected to play for the  World Team in the All-Star Futures Game and also played in the Pacific Coast League All-Star Game. He appeared in twenty games for the Royals after a September call-up.

Berroa was handed the starting shortstop job at the start of the 2003 season after the departure of Neifi Pérez (despite hitting a disappointing .194 in the previous season's Dominican Winter League). Berroa started the season hitting ninth in the batting order and committing 19 errors in his first 63 games. However, he finished the season with a .287 batting average with 17 home runs, 73 RBI, and 21 stolen bases, and committed only five more errors the rest of the season.  Late in the season, manager Tony Peña moved Berroa to the top of the batting order, and Berroa's performance sparked a media debate over who should be the American League Rookie of the Year: Berroa, Devil Rays outfielder Rocco Baldelli, Cleveland Indians outfielder Jody Gerut, or New York Yankees outfielder Hideki Matsui, a former star in the Central League of Nippon Professional Baseball.

Rookie of the Year
Berroa became the fourth member of the Royals to win the Rookie of the Year award, following Lou Piniella (1969), Bob Hamelin (1994), and Carlos Beltrán (1999).

Subsequent seasons
Following his rookie year, Berroa's performance went down annually in on-base percentage, runs, slugging percentage, and stolen bases. His fielding statistics included 77 errors from 2003 to 2005 (24, 28 —leading all Major League shortstops while he had the lowest fielding percentage among shortstops – .955, 25) that were the most among starting American League shortstops in that time span. Berroa also produced declining walk totals in the years after his Rookie of the Year award. Berroa walked once every 21 plate appearances in 2003, but had fallen to a 36-to-1 PA/BB ratio in 2005. In both 2005 and 2006, he walked only 2.9% of the time, the second-worst and then the worst percentage in Major League Baseball. In 2006, he was last among AL qualifiers in batting average, on-base percentage, and slugging percentage.

The disappointment in Berroa's development may be related to being caught up in the "Age-gate" fiasco in early 2002 when many Latin American players, subjected to greater scrutiny by the United States government, turned out to be older than they claimed. Berroa was two years older than thought when he was drafted by Oakland and traded to Kansas City.

After a disappointing 2007 spring training, the Royals traded for Tony Peña Jr., another shortstop. Berroa, having lost his starting shortstop role, spent most of the 2007 season in Triple-A Omaha, appearing in only nine games for the Major League club. He again failed to make the 2008 club and spent the first two months in Omaha.

Los Angeles Dodgers

On June 6, 2008, Berroa was traded to the Los Angeles Dodgers (who were looking for a temporary replacement for injured starter Rafael Furcal).  Berroa received a surprisingly large amount of playing time, hitting .230 over 226 at-bats and starting 64 games at shortstop (appeared in 84 games overall).  Notably, he showed increased patience at the plate, drawing more walks than in any season since 2004 despite not playing a full season.  Additionally, he had one hit in two at-bats while appearing in five games in the postseason.

New York Yankees and New York Mets
On January 6, 2009, Berroa agreed to a minor league deal worth $900,000 with the New York Yankees. Despite a strong performance in spring training, he did not make the Opening Day roster.  He was added to the major league roster on April 25 following the injury to INF Cody Ransom. He got his first hit with the Yankees that same day.  He was designated for assignment on June 24 upon Ransom's return from the 60-day disabled list, and was granted his release on July 7.

On July 11, 2009, the New York Mets signed Berroa to a minor league contract assigned him to Triple-A Buffalo. On July 16, 2009, his contract was purchased by the major league club. He was designated for assignment on August 7, 2009.  He finished the season having played a combined 35 games with 49 at-bats and a .391 OPS for the Yankees and the Mets.

Late career
Los Angeles Dodgers
On December 17, 2009, Berroa was signed to a minor league contract with an invitation to spring training by the Dodgers. However, he failed to make the team and was released by the Dodgers on March 22, 2010.

San Francisco Giants
On April 28, 2010, Berroa signed a minor league contract with the San Francisco Giants. After a disappointing performance filling in while the AAA Fresno Grizzlies had a lack of depth at shortstop, Berroa was placed on the 7-day disabled list. On June 26, he was activated from the disabled list and released.

Arizona Diamondbacks
Berroa signed a minor league contract with the Arizona Diamondbacks on July 24, 2011. He was assigned to the Triple-A Reno Aces.

New Jersey Jackals
On April 4, 2012, the New Jersey Jackals of the Can-Am League announced they had signed Berroa. On July 26, 2012, it was announced Berroa had formally retired from baseball and was seeking a job in professional soccer.

Vaqueros Laguna
On February 6, 2015, Berroa signed with the Vaqueros Laguna in the Mexican League.  He was released on June 12, 2015.

Post-playing career
Berroa has been a coach with the GCL Red Sox since the 2017 season.

Personal
Berroa is the son-in-law of former major league player and coach Luis Silverio. Berroa and his wife Jennifer were married on January 15, 2005, and have twelve  children.

References

Further reading

External links

Angel Berroa at Baseball Almanac

1978 births
Living people
Arizona League Athletics players
Azucareros del Este players
Bridgeport Bluefish players
Brooklyn Cyclones players
Buffalo Bisons (minor league) players
Dominican Republic expatriate baseball players in Mexico
Dominican Republic expatriate baseball players in the United States
Fresno Grizzlies players
Gigantes del Cibao players
Kansas City Royals players
Leones de Yucatán players
Los Angeles Dodgers players
Major League Baseball players from the Dominican Republic
Major League Baseball Rookie of the Year Award winners
Major League Baseball shortstops
Major League Baseball third basemen
Mexican League baseball second basemen
Mexican League baseball third basemen
Midland RockHounds players
New Jersey Jackals players
New York Mets players
New York Yankees players
Omaha Royals players
People from Santiago de los Caballeros
Pericos de Puebla players
Reno Aces players
Scranton/Wilkes-Barre Yankees players
Tigres del Licey players
Toros del Este players
Vaqueros Laguna players
Visalia Oaks players
Wichita Wranglers players
Wilmington Blue Rocks players